Ptychotrema is a genus of air-breathing land snails, terrestrial pulmonate gastropod mollusks in the subfamily Enneinae of the family Streptaxidae.

Distribution 
The distribution of the genus Ptychotrema is Afrotropical, and includes:
 Uganda

Species 
Species within the genus Ptychotrema include:
 Ptychotrema mazumbiensis Tattersfield, 1999
 Ptychotrema usambarense Verdcourt

? subgenus Ennea

 Ptychotrema (Ennea) bequaerti (Dautzenberg & Germain, 1914)
 Ptychotrema (Ennea) fraterculus Pilsbry, 1919
 Ptychotrema (Ennea) paradoxulum (Martens, 1895)
 Ptychotrema (Ennea) pollonerae Preston, 1913
 Ptychotrema (Ennea) silvaticum Pilsbry, 1919

subgenus Haplonepion Pilsbry, 1919
 Ptychotrema (Haplonepion) geminatum (Martens, 1895)
 Ptychotrema (Haplonepion) runsoranum (Martens, 1892)

? subgenus Parennea

 Ptychotrema (Parennea) aequatoriale Pilsbry, 1919
 Ptychotrema (Parennea) cossyphae van Bruggen, 1989
 Ptychotrema (Parennea) goossensi (Adam & van Goethem, 1978)
 Ptychotrema (Parennea) kerereense (Adam & van Goethem, 1978)
 Ptychotrema (Parennea) kigeziense (Preston, 1913)
 Ptychotrema (Parennea) pelengeense (Adam & van Goethem, 1978)

References

Further reading 
 Adam W. & van Goethem J. L. (1978). Revision du sous-genre Parennea Pilsbry du Genre Ptychotrema Morch (Mollusca-Pulmonata-Streptaxidae)". Études du Continent Africain, Bruxelles 5: 1-79.
 Oke O. C. & Odiete W.O. (1996). "New species of land molluscs from south western Nigeria I. A new species attributed to Ptychotrema (Mollusca, Gastropoda)". Journal of African Zoology 110: 99-104.
 Verdcourt B. (1985). "New taxa of Gulella L. Pfr. and Ptychotrema Mörch (Mollusca, Streptaxidae) from Eastern Africa". Journal of Conchology 32(1): 109-122. abstract.

Streptaxidae
Taxonomy articles created by Polbot